Fredrik Hynning (born May 15, 1983, in Stockholm, Sweden) is a forward playing for the AIK hockey team in the Swedish Elitserien (SEL) league.

External links

References 

 
 
 

1983 births
AIK IF players
Living people
Luleå HF players
Swedish ice hockey left wingers
Timrå IK players
Ice hockey people from Stockholm